Kyra Sedgwick is an American actress, producer and director. Her career begin when she played Julia Shearer in the soap opera Another World from 1982 to 1983. Her first film was the 1985 drama film War and Love in which she starred. Her other roles in the late 1980s included Tai-Pan (1986) and Born on the Fourth of July (1989). During the 1990s, she co-starred in the films Singles opposite Campbell Scott (1992), Heart and Souls with Robert Downey Jr. (1993), Something to Talk About with Julia Roberts and Robert Duvall (1995), Phenomenon with John Travolta and again with Robert Duvall (1996), and Montana with Stanley Tucci (1998).

In the 2000s, Sedgwick appeared in the films What's Cooking? (2000), Secondhand Lions, her third collaboration with Robert Duvall (2003) and Loverboy which she also produced and was directed by her husband Kevin Bacon (2005). In 2005, she was cast in the role of Brenda Leigh Johnson in the TNT police procedural series The Closer. She would play that role until the series ended in 2012. The role earned her a Golden Globe Award for Best Actress in Television Series Drama (2007) and Primetime Emmy Award for Outstanding Lead Actress in a Drama Series (2010). During that time she also appeared in the films The Game Plan (2007), Gamer (2009), and Man on a Ledge (2012).

Sedgwick's other television credits include Talk to Me (2000), Queens Supreme (2003), as Madeline Wuntch in Brooklyn Nine-Nine (2014–2020), Ten Days in the Valley (2017–2018), and Call Your Mother (2021).

Film

Television

References

External links
 

American filmographies